The United States Virgin Islands women's national soccer team is the national women's soccer team of the U.S. Virgin Islands and is overseen by the U.S. Virgin Islands Soccer Federation.

Players

Current squad
The following were called up for the match against Saint Kitts and Nevis on April 12, 2022.

Recent call-ups
The following players have been called up within the past 12 months.

Notable players

  Ariel Stolz - played for ŽNK Olimpija Ljubljana

Recent schedule and results

The following is a list of match results in the last 12 months, as well as any future matches that have been scheduled.

Legend

2022

Competitive record

Major

World Cup

*Draws include knockout matches decided on penalty kicks.

Minor

CONCACAF W Championship

*Draws include knockout matches decided on penalty kicks.

References
 3. https://www.fifa.com/about-fifa/associations/VIR

External links
FIFA Profile

Caribbean women's national association football teams
women